Ernest Theodore Lindemann (June 10, 1883 – December 27, 1951) was an American professional baseball player who played in 1907.

External links

Baseball players from New York (state)
Boston Doves players
Major League Baseball pitchers
1883 births
1951 deaths
Waterbury Rough Riders players